Janne Vermasheinä (born 13 January 1970) is a Finnish freestyle swimmer. He competed in the men's 4 × 100 metre freestyle relay event at the 1992 Summer Olympics.

References

External links
 

1970 births
Living people
Finnish male freestyle swimmers
Olympic swimmers of Finland
Swimmers at the 1992 Summer Olympics
People from Kouvola
Sportspeople from Kymenlaakso